David Rainey (born 6 April 1976) is a footballer from Northern Ireland who plays as a striker.

Club career

Early career
Davy previously played for Glentoran and Ards. He won many trophies while in East Belfast, including an Irish League title and Irish Cup medal. While with Ards, he won the Irish First Division title in 2001.

Crusaders
In 2005, he dropped down a division to join Crusaders, for whom he hit 30 goals in his first season to ensure immediate promotion, as well as winning the Intermediate League Cup and Steel & Sons Cup. In the following season in the top flight, he scored 13 goals overall, 2 behind the Crues' top scorer Davy Larmour. In the 2007–08 season he scored in the 2008 CIS Cup Final, but two late Linfield goals ensured the Crues' were defeated 3–2. It was Rainey's first cup final goal, and he was named in the 2008 Irish League Select XI as a result after 24 goals that season.

He came on as a substitute in the 2008–09 Irish Cup final as Crusaders defeated Cliftonville. In that season he was joint-top scorer with Mark Dickson with 17. He was again the Crues' top scorer in 2009–10 with 19 in all competitions, adding the County Antrim Shield to his Crusaders' trophy collection.

In 2010-11 he found himself mostly as substitute to Jordan Owens and Michael Halliday, and scored just one league goal with 8 overall. The following season, he added the Irish League Cup and the Setanta Cup to his trophy collection, meaning he has won every domestic honour available. He was once again the club's top scorer in 2011–12, with 20 goals.

Rainey's final season with Crusaders was the 2012–13 season, where he scored 8 goals, all in the league. Fittingly, in his final match for the club he scored the winning goal in a 2–1 win at Windsor Park against Linfield on the final day of the season. It was his 139th goal in 320 games for the Hatchetmen, making him the fifth-highest goalscorer at the time in Crusaders' history, after Glenn Hunter (157 goals), Curry Mulholland (149 goals), Danny Hale (143 goals) and Jim Weatherup (142 goals). His tally has since been surpassed also by Jordan Owens.

Honours

Ballyclare Comrades
Ulster Cup 1997-98

Glentoran
Irish League (1): 1998–99
Irish Cup (1): 1999–2000
Gold Cup (2): 1998–99, 1999–2000
County Antrim Shield (2): 1998–99, 1999–2000

Ards
Irish First Division (1): 2000–01

Crusaders
Irish Cup (1): 2008–09
Setanta Cup (1): 2012
Irish League Cup (1): 2011–12
County Antrim Shield (1): 2009–10
Irish First Division (1): 2005–06
IFA Intermediate League Cup (1): 2005–06
Steel & Sons Cup (1): 2005–06

Glenavon
Irish Cup (1): 2013-14

References

Association footballers from Northern Ireland
Ards F.C. players
Ballyclare Comrades F.C. players
Crusaders F.C. players
Glentoran F.C. players
Living people
1976 births
Association football forwards
Glenavon F.C. players
Harland & Wolff Welders F.C. players